Region Avia, also styled Region-Avia or Region Avia Airlines,  was a regional airline based in Moscow, Russia, operating scheduled passenger flights out of Domodedovo International Airport, and chartered services out of Bykovo Airport.

History
Region Avia was registered in Moscow in 2005, as a company which was to 52% owned by (unnamed) Russian citizens and had an initial funding of $50 million. It received its Air Operator's Certificate on 19 August 2006. The last scheduled flight (from Tambov to Moscow) took place on 31 December 2010, and the company was dissolved in early 2011.

Destinations
At its height in 2009, Region Avia operated scheduled services to the following domestic destinations:
Arkhangelsk - Talagi Airport
Anapa - Anapa Airport
Ivanovo - Ivanovo Yuzhny Airport
Kursk - Kursk Vostochny Airport
Moscow - Domodedovo International Airport (base)
Nizhny Novgorod - Nizhny Novgorod International Airport
Petrozavodsk - Petrozavodsk Airport
Pskov - Pskov Airport
Saint Petersburg - Pulkovo Airport
Sochi - Sochi International Airport
Tambov - Tambov Donskoye Airport
Yaroslavl - Tunoshna Airport
Between 2007 and 2008, Region-Avia had offered flights from Yekaterinburg to Magnitogorsk, Ufa and Nyagan on behalf of Aviaprad.

Fleet
The Region Avia Airlines fleet included the following aircraft:
8 Antonov An-28
8 Embraer EMB 120 Brasilia
The company had plans to acquire a fleet of up to 50 foreign-made aircraft (either ATR 42, ATR 72 or Bombardier Dash 8) by 2012.

References

External links

Official website
Region Avia aircraft

Defunct airlines of Russia
Airlines established in 2005
Airlines disestablished in 2011
Companies based in Moscow